Jocelyn Cault-Lhenry (born  as Jocelyn Lhenry) is a French curler.

Teams

References

External links

Living people
French female curlers
Date of birth missing (living people)
Place of birth missing (living people)
Year of birth missing (living people)